Bruchidius brincki, is a species of leaf beetle found in Sri Lanka and Vietnam.

Description
Antennae short, and dark brown with blackish apical segment. Posterior legs are black. There is a large black area beyond the middle of elytra. Elytra variegated with white and dark markings. Elytral integument is black.

It is a seed borer commonly found in Desmodium heterocarpon seeds.

References 

Bruchinae
Insects of Sri Lanka
Beetles described in 1975